Daniel Ruiz Robinson (born June 16, 1988, in Veracruz, Mexico) is a former Mexican footballer who played for El Tanque Sisley of the Primera Division in Uruguay.

Teams
  Veracruz 2006–2008
  El Tanque Sisley 2009–2010
  Mérida F.C. 2010–present

References
 
 

1988 births
Living people
Mexican expatriate footballers
Mexican footballers
Footballers from Veracruz
El Tanque Sisley players
Expatriate footballers in Uruguay
Association football goalkeepers